Narrative ethics is an approach that focuses on personal identity through story, and particular events in the life story of the individual or community.  These form a basis for ethical reflection and learning, both for individuals or groups. In many respects it resembles or presupposes virtue ethics.

See also 
 Adam Zachary Newton
 Alasdair MacIntyre
 Aretaic turn
 Hilde Lindemann
 Martha Nussbaum

References

Virtue ethics